Mian Kuh (also Romanized as Mīān Kūh; also known as Ḩoseynābād) is a village in Do Hezar Rural District, Khorramabad District, Tonekabon County, Mazandaran Province, Iran. At the 2006 census, its population was 93, in 35 families.

References 

Populated places in Tonekabon County